Free Yourself is a 2004 album by Fantasia.

Free Yourself may also refer to:

"Free Yourself, Be Yourself", a song by the Brothers Johnson from Right on Time 
Free Yourself (Experience Unlimited album), a studio album released in 1977 by Experience Unlimited 
"Free Yourself", a 1985 single by The Untouchables
Free Yourself, a 1994 Gospel LP by Don Potter
"Free Yourself", a song by Chaka Khan from the soundtrack of To Wong Foo, Thanks for Everything! Julie Newmar
Free Yourself (song), a song by Fantasia from the album with the same name
"Free Yourself", a 2018 single by Chemical Brothers included in their 2019 album, No Geography
Free Yourself (Jessie Ware song), a 2022 single released by British singer-songwriter Jessie Ware